Riley Moore (born July 1, 1980) is an American politician who has served as West Virginia State Treasurer since January 2021. A member of the Republican Party, he previously served in the West Virginia House of Delegates for the 67th district.

Early life and career
Moore earned an apprenticeship certificate in welding from the C. S. Monroe Technology Center, a bachelor's degree in government from George Mason University, and a master's degree in strategic security studies from the National Defense University. He also served as a staffer on the United States House Committee on Foreign Affairs. From 2013 to 2017, Moore was a Vice President at the Podesta Group where he was part of a client team working on the European Centre for a Modern Ukraine (ECFMU), which had been formed to represent former Ukrainian President, Viktor Yanukovych.

House of Delegates
With Stephen Skinner opting not to run for reelection for the 67th district in the West Virginia House of Delegates in 2016, Moore ran to succeed him, defeating Rod Snyder. He was elected, and served as assistant majority whip for the Republicans.

In 2018, Moore was named by Speaker of the House Roger Hanshaw as the next Majority Leader in the House. He lost his reelection bid in 2018 to John Doyle. He worked as a director at Textron.

State Treasurer of West Virginia
In 2020, Moore ran for West Virginia State Treasurer. He was unopposed in the Republican primary, and faced 24-year incumbent John Perdue in the general election. Moore won the general election with 56% of the vote.

Riley opposes ESG investing during his tenure as State Treasurer. In June 2022, Moore issued a letter to six financial institutions (BlackRock, JPMorgan Chase, Wells Fargo, Morgan Stanley, US Bancorp and Goldman Sachs) saying that they would no longer be allowed to do business with the state of West Virginia, because of their advocacy against the fossil fuel industry.

U.S. House campaign

Personal life
Moore's grandfather, Arch A. Moore Jr., is a former governor of West Virginia. Moore was named for his grandmother, Shelley Riley Moore. His aunt, Shelley Moore Capito, and cousin, Moore Capito, are also politicians. Moore and his wife, Guillermina ( Garcia), and their two daughters and son live in Harpers Ferry, West Virginia.

References

External links

1980 births
Candidates in the 2024 United States House of Representatives elections
George Mason University alumni
Living people
Moore family of West Virginia
National Defense University alumni
People from Harpers Ferry, West Virginia
Republican Party members of the West Virginia House of Delegates
State treasurers of West Virginia